Hayslip is a surname. Notable people with the surname include:

Ben Hayslip (born 1970), American country songwriter
Le Ly Hayslip (born 1949), Vietnamese-American writer and humanitarian

See also
Haislip